Coto Brus is a canton in the Puntarenas province of Costa Rica. The head city is in San Vito district.

History 
Coto Brus was created on 10 December 1965 by decree 3598.

Geography 
Coto Brus has an area of  km² and a mean elevation of  metres.

The upland canton shares its eastern border with Panama. The northern limit is high in the Cordillera de Talamanca, and the southwestern boundary runs through the Fila Zapote, one of many small coastal mountain ranges inland from Costa Rica's Pacific coast.

Districts 
The canton of Coto Brus is subdivided into the following districts:
 San Vito
 Sabalito
 Aguabuena
 Limoncito
 Pittier
 Gutiérrez Braun

Demographics 

For the 2011 census, Coto Brus had a population of  inhabitants.

Transportation

Road transportation 
The canton is covered by the following road routes:

References 

Cantons of Puntarenas Province
Populated places in Puntarenas Province